The women's 500 metres races of the 2014–15 ISU Speed Skating World Cup 1, arranged in the Meiji Hokkaido-Tokachi Oval, in Obihiro, Japan, were held on the weekend of 14–16 November 2014.

Race one was won by Lee Sang-hwa of South Korea, while Nao Kodaira of Japan came second, and Olga Fatkulina of Russia came third. Vanessa Bittner of Austria won Division B of race one, and was thus, under the rules, automatically promoted to Division A for race two.

In race two, the top two were the same as in race one, Lee and Kodaira, while Bittner took the bronze with a new Austrian record on both senior and junior level. Park Seung-hi of South Korea won Division B of race two.

Race 1
Race one took place on Friday, 14 November, with Division B scheduled in the morning session, at 11:54, and Division A scheduled in the afternoon session, at 16:22.

Division A

Division B

Race 2
Race two took place on Sunday, 16 November, with Division B scheduled in the morning session, at 12:30, and Division A scheduled in the afternoon session, at 16:13.

Division A

Notes: NR = national record.

Division B

References

Women 0500
1